A list of reptiliomorphs, (excluding amniotes), throughout their time.

A 
Anthracosaurus
Archeria
Ariekanerpeton

B 
Bystrowiana

C 
Chroniosaurus
Chroniosuchus
Cricotus

D 
Diadectes
Diasparactus
Diplovertebron
Discosauriscus

E 
Enosuchus
Eogyrinus

G 
 Gefyrostegus

K 
Karpinskiosaurus
Kotlassia

L 
Lanthanosuchus
Leptoropha
Limnoscelis

M 
Macroleter

N 
Neopteroplax

O 
Orobates

P 
Pholiderpeton
Proterogyrinus
Pteroplax

R 
Rhinosauriscus

S 
Seymouria
Solenodonsaurus

T 
Tokosaurus
Tseajaia
Tulerpeton

U 
Uralerpeton
Utegenia

W 
Westlothiana

Reptiliomorphs